Chen Maiping (born November 4, 1952 in Changshu, Jiangsu) is a Chinese-Swedish writer and poet, known by the pen name Wan Zhi. He has written mostly short stories, and has also translated literature from English and Swedish to Chinese.

During the late 1970s and early 1980s, Chen was an avid contributor to the non-sanctioned, underground literature magazine Jintian (Today). For this, he became watched by the Chinese authorities, and since 1986 he is living in exile. After the Tiananmen Square massacre in 1989, he started Jintian for Chinese in exile and dissentients within China.

Chen moved to Sweden in 1990. He has among other things taught Chinese at Stockholm University, and worked as a translator. He is also the vice president and secretary general of the Independent Chinese PEN Centre. He is married to translator and librarian Anna Gustafsson Chen, who, among other things, has translated Nobel laureate Mo Yan into Swedish.

References 

People's Republic of China translators
Chinese male short story writers
1952 births
Living people
English–Chinese translators
Translators from Swedish
Translators to Chinese
Artists from Suzhou
Writers from Suzhou
Chinese–English translators
Literary translators
20th-century Chinese male writers
21st-century male writers
Central Academy of Drama alumni
Capital Normal University alumni
University of Oslo alumni
People's Republic of China short story writers
Short story writers from Jiangsu
20th-century Chinese translators
21st-century Chinese translators
20th-century Chinese short story writers
21st-century Chinese short story writers